Dario Đumić (born 30 January 1992) is a Bosnian professional footballer who plays as a centre-back for 2. Bundesliga club SV Sandhausen and the Bosnia and Herzegovina national team.

Đumić started his professional career at Norwich City, before joining Brøndby in 2010. Six years later, he moved to NEC. In 2017, Đumić was transferred to Utrecht, who loaned him to Dynamo Dresden in 2018 and to Darmstadt 98 in 2019. The following year, he switched to Twente. He signed with SV Sandhausen in 2022.

A former Danish youth international, Đumić made his senior international debut for Bosnia and Herzegovina in 2017.

Club career

Early career
Because of the outbreak of Bosnian War, Đumić's family fled from his native Bosnia and Herzegovina and moved to Denmark, where he started playing football at local clubs, before joining youth academy of English team Norwich City in 2008. He made his professional debut against Swindon Town on 10 November 2009 at the age of 17.

In January 2010, Đumić moved to Brøndby. On 4 December 2011, he scored his first professional goal against Køge.

In February 2016, he switched to Dutch side NEC.

Utrecht
In July 2017, Đumić was transferred to Utrecht for an undisclosed fee. He made his official debut for the club in UEFA Europa League play-offs against Zenit St. Petersburg on 16 August. Two weeks later, he made his league debut.

In June 2018, Đumić was sent on a season-long loan to German outfit Dynamo Dresden.

In July 2019, he was loaned to Darmstadt 98 until the end of season.

Twente
In September 2020, Đumić signed a two-year contract with Twente. He made his competitive debut for the team on 25 September against Groningen. On 17 January 2021, he scored his first goal for Twente against the same opponent.

Later stage of career
In January 2022, Đumić joined SV Sandhausen.

International career
Despite representing Denmark at various youth levels, Đumić decided to play for Bosnia and Herzegovina at senior level.

In August 2016, his request to change sports citizenship from Danish to Bosnian was approved by FIFA. Subsequently, he received his first senior call-up in March 2017, for a 2018 FIFA World Cup qualifier against Gibraltar and a friendly game against Albania. He debuted against the latter on 28 March.

On 7 October, in a 2018 FIFA World Cup qualifier against Belgium, Đumić scored his first senior international goal.

Personal life
Đumić graduated with a bachelor of laws honours from University of Southern Denmark.

Career statistics

Club

International

Scores and results list Bosnia and Herzegovina's goal tally first, score column indicates score after each Đumić goal.

References

External links

1992 births
Living people
Footballers from Sarajevo
Croats of Bosnia and Herzegovina
Bosnia and Herzegovina refugees
Bosnia and Herzegovina emigrants to Denmark
Naturalised citizens of Denmark
Danish men's footballers
Denmark youth international footballers
Danish expatriate men's footballers
Bosnia and Herzegovina footballers
Bosnia and Herzegovina international footballers
Bosnia and Herzegovina expatriate footballers
Association football central defenders
Norwich City F.C. players
Brøndby IF players
NEC Nijmegen players
FC Utrecht players
Dynamo Dresden players
SV Darmstadt 98 players
FC Twente players
SV Sandhausen players
Danish Superliga players
Eredivisie players
2. Bundesliga players
Expatriate footballers in England
Expatriate men's footballers in Denmark
Expatriate footballers in the Netherlands
Expatriate footballers in Germany
Danish expatriate sportspeople in England
Danish expatriate sportspeople in the Netherlands
Danish expatriate sportspeople in Germany
Bosnia and Herzegovina expatriate sportspeople in England
Bosnia and Herzegovina expatriate sportspeople in Denmark
Bosnia and Herzegovina expatriate sportspeople in the Netherlands
Bosnia and Herzegovina expatriate sportspeople in Germany